Jupiter Pictures was an Indian feature film production company founded in Coimbatore in 1934 by M. Somasundaram (popularly known as "Jupiter Somu") and S.K. Mohideen. Jupiter Pictures was a major production house with 46 releases with 36 films released in Tamil, 5 in Telugu, 2 each in Kannada and Hindi and one joint release in Tamil and Telugu.  In the late 40s and early 50s, they operated out of Central Studios in Coimbatore. Following the closure of the studio, they relocated to Chennai and took over Neptune Studio in Adayar which would later become Sathya Studios. In Chennai, the Jupiter Pictures office operated from a leased historic and palatial building in Mylapore known as "Mangala Vilas".

A. S. A. Sami directed most of his films with Jupiter Pictures. In Chennai during the 50s and 60s, Jupiter produced many successful films, such as "Manohara" (1954, directed by L.V. Prasad), "Karpukkarasi" (1957, A. S. A. Sami), "Thangapathumai" (1959, Sami), "Ellorum Innattu Mannar"(1960, Tatineni Prakasha Rao), "Arasilankumari" (1961, Sami). Jupiter Pictures films made with other producers were sometimes less popular. In its later years the company was managed by S.K. Habibullah (son of S.K.Mohideen).

Filmography
 "Menaka" (1935) [Released in Sri Shanmuganandha Talkie Company]
 "Chandrakantha" (1936) [First Movie, under Jupiter Pictures label]
 "Anaadhai Penn" (1938)
 "Kannagi" (1942) [Highest grossing Film of the year]
 "Kubera Kuchela" (1943) [One of Highest grosser]
 "Mahamaya" (1944)
 "Vidyapathi" (1946)
 "Sri Murugan" (1946) [One of Highest grosser]
 "Rajakumari" (1947) [One of Highest grosser, and made M. G. Ramachandran as star]
 "Kanjan" (1947)
 "Abhimanyu" (1948)
 "Mohini" (1948)
 "Velaikkaari" (1949) (C. N. Annadurai's First Film)
 "Kanniyin Kaadhali" (1949) (Madhuri Devi in dual role, 1 role disguised as male)
 "Krishna Vijayam" (1950)
 "Vijayakumari" (1950)
 "Marmayogi" (1951) (Highest grosse; one of MGR's successful movie. directed by K. Ramnath.)
 "Sthree Sahasam" (1951) (Distributor Only)
 "Sudharshan" (1951) (Distributor Only) (P. U. Chinnappa's Last Film)
 "Kaithi" (1951)
 "Rani" (1952) (Bilingual Film, simultaneously made in Hindi)
 "Zamindar" (1952)
 "Naam" (1953) ([Jupiter- Mekala Pictures, combined banner]
 "Manithan" (1953)
 "Inspector" (1953) [director R.S. Mani]
 "Azhagi" (1953)
 "Manohara" (1954) [Produced under Manohar Pictures banner, director L.V.Prasad]
 "Sorgavasal" (1954) [Produced under Parimalam Pictures banner, director A. Kasilingam]
 "Santosham" (1955) [Telugu Movie, Remake of Velaikkaari]
 "Karpukkarasi" (1957) [director A.S.A. Samy]
 "Kanniyin Sabatham" (1958) [director T. R. Raghunath]
 "Thanga Padhumai" (1959) [director A.S.A.Samy]
 "Arasilankumari" (1961) [director A.S.A.Samy]

References

External links
 Coimbatore’s celluloid connection – Chennai – The Hindu
 The Hindu : Fascinating journey to fame
 Sachi Sri Kantha- MGR Remembered Part 9 MGR Remembered – His first Lead action movie Rajakumari

Film production companies of Tamil Nadu
Companies based in Coimbatore
Film production companies based in Coimbatore
Indian companies established in 1934
Indian companies disestablished in 1983
Mass media companies established in 1934
Mass media companies disestablished in 1983